Tamluk Hamilton High School is the second oldest school in the district of Midnapore, India. It originated in 1852, five years before the founding of the University of Calcutta.

History
The school is the second oldest institution in the district of Medinipur. It was founded in 1852 by Robert Charles Hamilton, a salt merchant.

Notable alumni
 Khudiram Bose
Mukul Dey
 Ajoy Kumar Mukherjee
Sushil Kumar Dhara
Paresh Maity
Shamit Bhanja

School uniform
White shirt with black shorts or trousers, white socks and black shoes.

See also
Education in India
List of schools in India
Education in West Bengal

References

External links
Website: Tamluk Hamilton High School : West Bengal

High schools and secondary schools in West Bengal
Schools in Purba Medinipur district
Educational institutions established in 1852
1852 establishments in India